Paranda Assembly constituency is one of the 288 Vidhan Sabha (legislative assembly) constituencies of Maharashtra state in western India.

Overview
Paranda (constituency number 243) is one of the four Vidhan Sabha constituencies located in the Osmanabad district. It covers the entire Paranda, Bhum and Washi tehsils. The number of electors in 2009 was 268,195 (male 142,381, female 125,814).

Paranda is part of the Osmanabad Lok Sabha constituency along with five other Vidhan Sabha segments, namely Umarga, Tuljapur and Osmanabad in Osmanabad district, Barshi in Solapur district and Ausa in the Latur district.

Members of Legislative Assembly

See also
 Constituencies of the Maharashtra Vidhan Sabha
 Paranda

References

Assembly constituencies of Maharashtra
Osmanabad district